Own Affairs was, in 1984, the first full-length album by the Kalahari Surfers, the recording identity of South African musician Warrick Sony.

Sony had worked as a freelance sound engineer in the South African film industry, and used this to acquire many of the sound samples he later used in his music. Shifty Records tried to release Own Affairs, but could not find a vinyl plant which would press it. Chris Cutler's London-based Recommended Records pressed the album, the start of a long-standing alliance. Own Affairs was hailed as breathtaking, innovative and humorous by the Weekly Mail. The Sunday Times called it "a music born from the spilled seed of our national sickness and nurtured to nightmarehood in the moral drought of daily life/politics".

Contributors
Rick Van Heerden: saxophone
Anne Botha : voice
Brian Rath: drums

Track listing
"Free State Fence" 03:18
"The Surfer" 02:06
"Prayer For Civilisation" 05:21
"Hillbrow 1" 05:42
"Hillbrow 2" 02:07
"Hippo In Town" 02:55
"Independence Day" 06:35
"Don't Dance" 02:54
"Crossed Cheques" 03:34
"September 84" 02:45

References

External links
Official site

1984 albums
Kalahari Surfers albums